This is a list of award winners and league leaders for the Toronto Blue Jays of Major League Baseball.

Individual Player Awards

All-MLB First Team

2021 - Vladimir Guerrero Jr.
2021 - Marcus Semien
2021 - Robbie Ray
2022 - Alek Manoah

All-MLB Second Team
2020 - Hyun-jin Ryu
2021 - Teoscar Hernández

AL Most Valuable Player Award
1987 – George Bell
2015 – Josh Donaldson

AL Cy Young Award
1996 – Pat Hentgen
1997 – Roger Clemens
1998 – Roger Clemens
2003 – Roy Halladay
2021 – Robbie Ray

Warren Spahn Award
Best Left-handed Pitcher Award in Major League Baseball

2020 – Hyun Jin Ryu

Edgar Martínez Award
Outstanding Designated Hitter Award

1992 – Dave Winfield
1993 – Paul Molitor
2009 – Adam Lind

AL Rookie of the Year Award
1979 – Alfredo Griffin
2002 – Eric Hinske

AL Gold Glove Award
Pitcher
R. A. Dickey (2013)
Marcus Stroman (2017)
Catcher
none

First base 
Vladimir Guerrero Jr.  (2022)

Second base
Roberto Alomar [5] (1991–95)
Orlando Hudson (2005)
Marcus Semien (2021)
Shortstop
Tony Fernández [4] (1986–89)
Third base
Kelly Gruber (1990)
Outfield 
Jesse Barfield [2] (1986–87)
Devon White [5] (1991–95)
Shawn Green (1999)
Vernon Wells [3] (2004–06)

Wilson Defensive Player of the Year Award by Position 
• CF Kevin Pillar (2015)

See explanatory note at Atlanta Braves award winners and league leaders.

AL Silver Slugger Awards
Best offensive player at each position

DH
Dave Winfield (1992)
Paul Molitor (1993)
José Canseco (1998)
Adam Lind (2009)

Catcher
Alejandro Kirk (2022)

First baseman
Fred McGriff (1989)
Carlos Delgado [3] (1999, 2000, 2003)
Vladimir Guerrero Jr. (2021)

Second baseman
Damaso Garcia (1982)
Roberto Alomar (1992)
Aaron Hill (2009)
Marcus Semien (2021)

Shortstop
none

Third baseman
Kelly Gruber (1990) 
Josh Donaldson [2] (2015, 2016)

Outfielders 
Lloyd Moseby (1983)
George Bell [3] (1985, 1986, 1987)
Jesse Barfield (1986)
Joe Carter [2] (1991, 1992)
Shawn Green (1999)
Vernon Wells (2003)
José Bautista [3] (2010, 2011, 2014)
Teoscar Hernandez [2] (2020, 2021)

Silver Bat Award
AL Batting Average Leader

1993 – John Olerud

AL Hank Aaron Award
Awarded to the most outstanding offensive player

2000 – Carlos Delgado
2010 – José Bautista
2011 – José Bautista
2015 – Josh Donaldson
2021 – Vladimir Guerrero Jr.

AL Manager of the Year
1985 – Bobby Cox

AL Comeback Player of the Year
2009 – Aaron Hill

ALCS Most Valuable Player
1992 – Roberto Alomar
1993 – Dave Stewart

World Series Most Valuable Player
1992 – Pat Borders
1993 – Paul Molitor

All-Star Game Most Valuable Player
2021 – Vladimir Guerrero Jr.

DHL Hometown Heroes (2006)
 Joe Carter — voted by MLB fans as the most outstanding player in Blue Jays franchise history. Criteria included: on-field performance, leadership quality and character value

The Sporting News American League Player of the Year
1987 – George Bell
2000 – Carlos Delgado
2015 – Josh Donaldson

The Sporting News American League Pitcher of the Year
1982 – Dave Stieb
1987 – Jimmy Key
1996 – Pat Hentgen
1997 – Roger Clemens
1998 – Roger Clemens
2003 – Roy Halladay

Baseball America All-Rookie Team
See: Baseball America#Baseball America All-Rookie Team
2011 – Brett Lawrie (3B)

Team award
 – William Harridge Trophy (American League champion)
1992 – Commissioner's Trophy (World Series)
 – William Harridge Trophy (American League champion)
1993 – Commissioner's Trophy (World Series)
1994 (1993 Toronto Blue Jays) – Outstanding Team ESPY Award
2012 – Allan H. Selig Award for Philanthropic Excellence
2020 — Allan H. Selig Award for Philanthropic Excellence

Franchise records

Other achievements

National Baseball Hall of Fame inductees
See:

Retired numbers
See: Toronto Blue Jays#Retired numbers

Level of Excellence
See: Toronto Blue Jays#Level of Excellence

All-Star Game Selections

BBWAA Neil MacCarl Award
This award is presented by the BBWAA to the Toronto Blue Jays Player of the Year.

BBWAA Toronto Chapter Blue Jays Awards Pitcher of the Year Award

World Baseball Classic MVP
2017 – Marcus Stroman (P)

Minor league system

AAA International League Rookie of the Year
 1989 – Francisco Cabrera
 1994 – Shawn Green

AAA International League Player of the Year
 1991 – Derek Bell
 2000 – Chad Mottola
 2015 – Matt Hague

AAA International League Most Valuable Pitcher Award
 1985 – Tom Henke
 1989 – Alex Sanchez
 1998 – Shannon Withem

AAA Pacific Coast League Most Valuable Player Award
 2009 – Randy Ruiz
 2010 – J.P. Arencibia

American League Offensive Leaders

AL Home Runs Leaders
1986 – Jesse Barfield
1989 – Fred McGriff
2010 – José Bautista
2011 – José Bautista
2021 – Vladimir Guerrero Jr.

AL RBI Leader
1987 – George Bell
2003 – Carlos Delgado
2015 – Josh Donaldson
2016 – Edwin Encarnación

AL Runs Scored Leader
2015 – Josh Donaldson
2021 – Vladimir Guerrero Jr.

AL Bases on Balls Leader
2011 – José Bautista
2015 – José Bautista

AL Singles Leader
1986 – Tony Fernández

AL Doubles Leader
1993 – John Olerud
1999 – Shawn Green
2000 – Carlos Delgado
2003 – Vernon Wells (co-leader)

AL Triples Leaders
1980 – Alfredo Griffin (co-leader)
1984 – Dave Collins (co-leader) & Lloyd Moseby (co-leader)

AL Extra-Base Hits Leader
1987 – George Bell
2015 – Josh Donaldson

At-Bats Leader
1986 – Tony Fernández

AL Total Bases Leader
1987 – George Bell

AL OPS Leader
1989 – Fred McGriff

AL Games Played Leaders
1979 – Rick Bosetti (co-leader)
1982 – Alfredo Griffin (co-leader)
1983 – Alfredo Griffin (co-leader)
1986 – Tony Fernández

AL Sacrifice Flies Leader
1989 – George Bell
2015 – Edwin Encarnación (co-leader) & Josh Donaldson (co-leader)

AL At-Bats per Strikeout Leader
1978 – Bob Bailor

AL Outs Leaders
1980 – Alfredo Griffin
1986 – Tony Fernández

American League Pitching Leaders

MLB Triple Crown ~ Pitching
MLB Leader in ERA, Wins & Strike Outs

1997 – Roger Clemens
1998 – Roger Clemens

AL Earned Run Average Leaders
1985 – Dave Stieb
1987 – Jimmy Key
1996 – Juan Guzmán
1997 – Roger Clemens
1998 – Roger Clemens
2015 – David Price 
2016 – Aaron Sanchez
2021 – Robbie Ray

AL Adjusted ERA Leader
1997 – Roger Clemens
1998 – Roger Clemens

AL Wins Leaders
1992 – Jack Morris
1997 – Roger Clemens
1998 – Roger Clemens
2000 – David Wells
2003 – Roy Halladay

AL Strikeouts Leader
1997 – Roger Clemens
1998 – Roger Clemens
2008 – A.J. Burnett
2021 –Robbie Ray

AL Winning Percentage Leader
1984 – Doyle Alexander
1987 – Jeff Musselman
1993 – Juan Guzmán
2006 – Roy Halladay
2016 – Aaron Sanchez

AL Innings Pitched Leaders
1982 – Dave Stieb
1984 – Dave Stieb
1995 – David Cone (17 starts with Toronto Blue Jays 13 with New York Yankees)
1996 – Roger Clemens
1997 – Roger Clemens (co-leader)
1997 – Pat Hentgen (co-leader)
2002 – Roy Halladay
2003 – Roy Halladay
2008 – Roy Halladay
2021 – Robbie Ray

AL WHIP Leaders
1987 – Jimmy Key
1996 – Juan Guzmán
1997 – Roger Clemens
2008 – Roy Halladay
2021 – Robbie Ray

AL Batting Average Against Leaders
1984 – Dave Stieb
1985 – Dave Stieb
1987 – Jimmy Key
1996 – Juan Guzman
1998 – Roger Clemens
2015 – Marco Estrada
2016 – Marco Estrada

AL Saves Leaders
1987 – Tom Henke
1993 – Duane Ward (co-leader)

AL Appearance Leaders
1987 – Mark Eichhorn
1991 – Duane Ward
2001 – Paul Quantrill 
2003 – Trever Miller
2007 – Scott Downs (co-leader)
2022 – Adam Cimber

AL Games Started Leaders
1982 – Jim Clancy
1984 – Jim Clancy (co-leader)
1994 – Juan Guzmán
1997 – Pat Hentgen (co-leader)
2000 – David Wells
2003 – Roy Halladay
2008 – A.J. Burnett (co-leader)
2021 – Robbie Ray (co-leader)
2021 – José Berrios (co-leader)

AL Complete Games Leaders
1982 – Dave Stieb
1996 – Pat Hentgen
1997 – Roger Clemens (co-leader)
1997 – Pat Hentgen (co-leader)
1999 – David Wells
2000 – David Wells
2003 – Roy Halladay (co-leader)
2005 – Roy Halladay
2007 – Roy Halladay
2008 – Roy Halladay
2009 – Roy Halladay

AL Shutouts Leaders
1982 – Dave Stieb
1996 – Pat Hentgen (co-leader)
1997 – Roger Clemens (co-leader)
1997 – Pat Hentgen (co-leader)
2003 – Roy Halladay (co-leader)
2008 – Jesse Litsch (co-leader)
2009 – Roy Halladay

AL Losses Leaders
1979 – Phil Huffman
1981 – Luis Leal (co-leader)
1998 – Juan Guzmán (22 starts with Blue Jays, 11 with Baltimore Orioles)

AL Hits Allowed/9IP Leaders
1984 – Dave Stieb
1985 – Dave Stieb
1987 – Jimmy Key
1996 – Juan Guzmán
1998 – Roger Clemens
2015 – Marco Estrada
2016 – Marco Estrada

AL Strikeouts/9IP Leader
1998 – Roger Clemens
2008 – A. J. Burnett

AL Walks/9IP Leader
1989 – Jimmy Key
2000 – David Wells
2009 – Roy Halladay
2014 – Mark Buehrle

AL Home Runs Allowed Leader
1977 – Jerry Garvin

AL Walks Allowed Leader
1980 – Jim Clancy
1995 – Al Leiter
2004 – Miguel Batista (co-leader)

AL Hits Allowed Leaders
1982 – Dave Stieb
1995 – Pat Hentgen
2003 – Roy Halladay

AL Earned Runs Allowed Leaders
1977 – Dave Lemanczyk (co-leader)
1984 – Jim Clancy
1995 – Pat Hentgen
2000 – Chris Carpenter
2003 – Cory Lidle (co-leader)

AL Hit Batsmen Leaders
1981 – Dave Stieb (co-leader)
1983 – Dave Stieb
1984 – Dave Stieb
1986 – Dave Stieb
1989 – Dave Stieb
2014 – R.A. Dickey
2021 – Alek Manoah
2022 – Alek Manoah

AL Batters Faced Leaders
1982 – Dave Stieb
1996 – Pat Hentgen
1997 – Pat Hentgen
2003 – Roy Halladay
2008 – Roy Halladay

AL Games Finished Leader
1987 – Tom Henke
1993 – Duane Ward

American League Youngest Player
1981 – Fred Manrique
2015 – Roberto Osuna

American League Oldest Player
1987 – Phil Niekro
2012 – Omar Vizquel
2015 – LaTroy Hawkins
2016 – R. A. Dickey

See also

Baseball awards
List of Major League Baseball awards
Canadian Baseball Hall of Fame

Footnotes

External links
Blue Jays Awards webpage. Toronto Blue Jays official website

| colspan = 3 align = center | World Series Champions
|-
| width = 30% align = center | Preceded by:Minnesota Twins  1991
| width = 40% align = center | 1992 & 1993
| width = 30% align = center | Succeeded by :Atlanta Braves 1995
|-
| colspan = 3 align = center | American League Champions
|-
| width = 30% align = center | Preceded by:Minnesota Twins 1991
| width = 40% align = center | 1992 & 1993
| width = 30% align = center | Succeeded by :Cleveland Indians 1995
|-
|-
| colspan = 3 align = center | American League Eastern Division Champions
|-
| width = 30% align = center | Preceded by:Detroit Tigers 1984
| width = 40% align = center | 1985
| width = 30% align = center | Succeeded by :Boston Red Sox 1986
|-
| width = 30% align = center | Preceded by:Boston Red Sox 1988
| width = 40% align = center | 1989
| width = 30% align = center | Succeeded by :Boston Red Sox 1990
|-
| width = 30% align = center | Preceded by:Boston Red Sox 1990
| width = 40% align = center | 1991 – 1993
| width = 30% align = center | Succeeded by :Boston Red Sox 1995
|-
| width = 30% align = center | Preceded by:Baltimore Orioles 2014
| width = 40% align = center | 2015
| width = 30% align = center | Succeeded by:Boston Red Sox 2016

Awa
Major League Baseball team trophies and awards